China Internet Information Center (or 中国网/网上中国) is a state-run web portal of the People's Republic of China  of the State Council Information Office and the China International Publishing Group. 

Its editor-in-chief is Wang Xiaohui, who also serves as a vice minister of the Propaganda Department of the Chinese Communist Party.

Localization 
The site is available in Arabic, Chinese (Simplified), Chinese (Traditional), English, Esperanto, French, German, Japanese, Korean, Russian, and Spanish.

See also 
 Xinhua News Agency
 China News Service

References

External links 
Official site

Chinese news websites
Web portals
Chinese-language websites
Chinese propaganda organisations
Organizations associated with the Chinese Communist Party

Information operations units and formations
Disinformation operations